Corvette is a 2003 racing video game developed by Steel Monkeys' Glasgow and Minsk studios in which players race in cars from the 1950s and unlock cars in career mode to race cars from 1953 to 2003. Players can customize cars to fit their driving style. The game features traffic and policemen. The tracks come from Chicago and go to L.A. The game was released on Xbox, Game Boy Advance, Windows, and PlayStation 2.

Racing format

The racing format for this game contains Quick Race, Arcade, and Career mode. On the Arcade and Career modes, it starts in the first generation of Corvette in a series of races. There are several series of racing for all generations of Corvette. As the player wins the races, earns minor upgrades for their car. At the end of a section of that generation of Corvette, it goes on One-on-One race on the open road to win a trophy. If the players win, it will go to the next generation and its races. When completed, the gamer will unlock many cars, customized parts and tracks for Quick Race.

Reception

The game was met with a generally mixed to negative reception.  GameRankings and Metacritic gave it a score of 52.20% and 53 out of 100 for the Xbox version; 51.41% and 57 out of 100 for the PlayStation 2 version; and 49% and 58 out of 100 for the Game Boy Advance version.

References

2003 video games
Racing video games
Xbox games
PlayStation 2 games
Windows games
Game Boy Advance games
video game
Video games developed in Belarus
Video games developed in the United Kingdom
Global Star Software games
Multiplayer and single-player video games
TDK Mediactive games